H. Rodney Sharp III has been a director of DuPont since 1981.  Sharp is president of the Board of Trustees of Longwood Foundation, Inc., and a director of Wilmington Trust. He is a trustee and director of Christiana Care Corporation. Sharp also serves as secretary of the board of Planned Parenthood of Delaware.

References

Living people
DuPont people
20th-century American businesspeople
21st-century American businesspeople
Year of birth missing (living people)